Afeez Agoro Oladimeji  (born 13 December 1975) is a Nigerian citizen who was previously recognised as the tallest man in Nigeria. At , he stands shorter than his  compatriot, Abiodun Adegoke, who is likely the tallest man in Nigeria.

Early life 
Afeez Agoro was born in the city of Sabo Yaba, Lagos State on 13 December 1975 as the last child of three children for his mother who was the second wife of his late father. Afeez moved with his family to Akoka Yaba where he grew up and also had his education, he attended St. Finbarr's College, Yaba. Afeez obtained his ordinary National Diploma certificate from the University of Lagos and went further to get his Higher National Diploma certificate from the Lagos state Polytechnic.

Agoro had a normal growth until he developed an ailment at the age of nineteen and when taking to a hospital, was diagnosed with Acromegaly, known commonly as gigantism, which made him grow vertically at a very rapid rate. Agoro unsuccessfully tried to combat the ailment and currently stands at 7'5" which makes him among the tallest people in Africa.

Career 

In 2003, upon graduating from the Lagos State Polytechnic, Afeez Agoro went for his compulsory one-year National Youth Service Corps (NYSC) scheme in Kolokuma Local Government Area of Bayelsa State, Nigeria.
Afeez Agoro has had the opportunity to feature in movies and in August 2018, I Am Agoro a Reality TV Show centred around his life and what it feels like living as the tallest man in Nigeria started airing exclusively on Linda Ikeji TV (LITV).

See also 
 List of tallest people

References

External links 
 I Am Agoro on LITV

1975 births
Living people
20th-century Nigerian male actors
21st-century Nigerian male actors
Lagos State Polytechnic alumni
Models from Lagos
Nigerian male film actors
Nigerian male models
Participants in Nigerian reality television series
People with gigantism
University of Lagos alumni
Yoruba male actors
Yoruba male models